Peroz of Meshan (Middle Persian: 𐭯𐭩𐭫𐭥𐭰 Pērōz) was a Sasanian prince active during the reign of his grandfather, king (shah) Shapur I. He was a son of Shapur Meshanshah and possibly the latters wife Denag. He had at least six brothers, all of whom are mentioned in the trilingual inscription of Shapur I. Nothing more is known about Peroz. He may be the same the person as his namesake mentioned in the Paikuli inscription of Narseh, in which he appears as a court dignitary. According to the inscription, he supported Narseh against Bahram III (r. 293) in the struggle for the throne.

References

Sources 

Sasanian princes
3rd-century Iranian people
3rd-century births
Shapur I